Avikam is one of the Lagoon languages of Ivory Coast, spoken in Grand Lahou Département, Avikam Canton, South Department. It is a Kwa language, closely related to Alladian, but other than that its position is unclear.

Phonology 
Above is the consonant chart and below is the vowel chart.

References

Sources
 

Languages of Ivory Coast
Lagoon languages